Dongsi Shitiao station, is a station on Line 2 of the Beijing Subway.

Name

Dongsi Subdistrict is an area in the northeastern side of the old town of Beijing. Hutongs are sorted numerically from south to north, and are called "tiao" in local parlance. Shitiao therefore refers to the tenth hutong in the Dongsi area, counted from south to north.

Use
The station is particularly busy during Beijing Guo'an matches, due to its proximity to the Workers' Stadium.

Station Layout 
The Line 2 station has an underground island platform, whilst the future Line 3 will also have an underground island platform.

There is an unused platform below the existing Line 2 platform, built during the construction of the station, which was to have been used for the planned Line 3. The connection between the two levels is currently fenced off, but will finally open in 2023 when Line 3 becomes operational, almost 40 years after the station for Line 2 opened. The unused platform, originally meant for Line 3, will become the transfer hall between the two lines and will be renovated. Two new platforms will be built seven or eight metres below it, one for each direction.

Exits 
There are four exits, lettered A, B, C, and D. Exits B and C are accessible.

References

External links
 

Railway stations in China opened in 1984
Beijing Subway stations in Dongcheng District